The Basketmaker culture of the pre-Ancestral Puebloans began about 1500 BC and continued until about AD 750 with the beginning of the Pueblo I Era.  The prehistoric American southwestern culture was named "Basketmaker" for the large number of baskets found at archaeological sites of 3,000 to 2,000 years ago.

The people
Well-preserved mummies found in dry caves provide insight into the ancient Basketmakers.  Women were about 5 feet tall and men were 3 to 4 inches taller.  They had long, narrow faces and medium to stocky build.  Their skin varied from light to dark brown and they had brown or black hair and eyes.  Fancy hairstyles were sometimes worn by men and infrequently by women.  Women's hair may have been cut short; Significant quantities of rope made of human hair have been recovered and since it was more likely that men had fancy hairstyles, the hair for rope may have come from women.

The Basketmakers wore sandals made of woven yucca fibers or strips of leaves.  There is little evidence of clothing aside from a few loin-cloths found at archaeological sites.  Women may have worn aprons on special occasions. Hides or blankets made of yucca fibers and rabbit fur were likely for warmth.

Both men and women wore necklaces, bracelets and pendants made of shell, stone, bone and dried berries. Shells, such as abalone, conus and olivella from the coast of the Pacific ocean, would have been obtained through trade.

Basketmaker eras
In the Early Basketmaker II Era people lived a semi-nomadic hunter-gatherer lifestyle with the introduction of cultivation of corn, which led to a more settled, agrarian life.  Some of the early people lived in cave shelters in the San Juan River drainage.  Excavation of their sites yielded a large number of baskets, for which they received their name, corn and evidence of human burials. 

It was not until the Late Basketmaker II Era (about AD 50–500) that people lived in permanent dwellings, crude pit-houses made of brush, logs and earth.  During the later portion of this period fired pottery was introduced to the Basketmakers, which due to regional and evolutionary differences greatly aided in dating and tracking pottery origins following archaeological excavations.  Hunting became much easier during the Basketmaker III Era (about AD 500–750) when bow-and-arrow technology replaced the spear and atlatl used since the Archaic period of the Americas.

The following periods, the Pueblo Eras, saw the introduction of above-ground, multi-roomed masonry dwellings, more efficient stone tools, garments made of cotton or turkey feathers, and the introduction of the ceremonial kiva.

Landscape and climate
Throughout the Ancestral Puebloan cultural eras the most important resource was water. In the lowlands the climate was an arid land of juniper and sage.

Cultural groups and periods
The cultural groups of this period include:
 Ancestral Puebloans – southern Utah, southern Colorado, northern Arizona and northern and central New Mexico.
 Hohokam – southern Arizona.
 Mogollon – southeastern Arizona, southern New Mexico and northern Mexico.
 Patayan – western Arizona, California and Baja California.

References

Further reading
 Cassells, E. Steve. (1997) [1983] The Archaeology of Colorado. Boulder: Johnson Press. .
 Plog, Stephen. (1997) Ancient Peoples of the American Southwest. London: Thames and Hudson. .
 Stiger, Mark. (2001) Hunter-Gatherer Archaeology of the Colorado High Country. Boulder: University Press of Colorado.  .
 Time-Life Book Editors. (1993) [1992] The First Americans. Alexandria, Virginia:  Time-Life Books.  .
  Morris, Ann Axtell 1978 "Digging in the Southwest"

Archaeology of the United States
Archaeological cultures of North America
Native American history of Arizona
Native American history of Colorado
Native American history of Nevada
Native American history of New Mexico
Native American history of Utah
Oasisamerica cultures
Prehistoric cultures in Colorado
Pueblo history
Puebloan peoples
Southwest tribes
5th-century disestablishments
16th-century BC establishments